USS Metacomet may refer to the following ships of the United States Navy:

, was acquired by the US Navy in 1858 and renamed Pulaski
, was a wooden side-wheel steamer, launched 7 March 1863 and sold in 1865

United States Navy ship names